Peter Connor (born 18 May 1963) is an Irish sprint canoer who competed in the late 1980s. At the 1988 Summer Olympics in Seoul, he was eliminated in the semifinals of the K-2 1000 m event.

References
Sports-Reference.com profile

1963 births
Canoeists at the 1988 Summer Olympics
Irish male canoeists
Living people
Olympic canoeists of Ireland
Place of birth missing (living people)